Exide Industries Ltd, is an Indian multinational storage battery manufacturer company, headquartered in Kolkata. It is the largest manufacturer of automotive and industrial lead-acid batteries in India and fourth largest in the world. It has plants in India and Sri Lanka and dealership network in 46 countries spanning 5 continents. Exide also has four major lead-acid battery recycling facilities — two of which are in the United States, and Spain and Portugal each have one as well. The company claims that 99 percent of lead processed through these facilities is recycled.

In January 2013, Exide Industries acquired 100% of the equity capital of ING Vysya Life Insurance. In May 2014, the name of ING Vysya Life Insurance Company Limited was changed to Exide Life Insurance Company Limited.

The company has seven factories located across the country – two in Maharashtra, two in West Bengal - Shamnagar (Mother plant) & Haldia, one in Tamil Nadu Hosur, one in Haryana and two in Uttarakhand. Exide is the only company which provide submarine batteries to Indian Navy.

History 
This company was incorporated as Associated Battery Makers (Eastern) Ltd., on 31 January 1953 under the Companies Act, 1913 to purchase all or any of the assets of the business of manufacturers, buyers and sellers of and dealers in and repairers of electrical and chemical appliances and goods carried on by the Chloride Electric Storage Company (India) Ltd., in India, since 1916 with a view thereto to enter into and carry into effect (either with or without modification) an agreement which had already been prepared and was expressed to be made between the Chloride Electric Storage Co. (India) Ltd. on the one part and the company of the other part. The name of the company was changed to Chloride India Ltd. on 2 August 1972. The name of the company was again changed to Chloride Industries Ltd. vide fresh Certificate of Incorporation dated 12 October 1988. The company was further changed to Exide Industries Ltd. on 25 August 1995.

The company’s predecessor carried on their operations as import house from 1916 under the name Chloride Electrical Storage Company. Thereafter, the company started manufacturing storage batteries in the country and have grown to become one of the largest manufacturer and exporter of batteries in the sub-continent today. Exide separated from its UK-based parent, Chloride Group Plc., in 1989, after the latter divested its ownership in favour of a group of Indian shareholders.

Relationship between Exide Industries and Exide Technologies 

Chloride Electric Storage Co. Ltd. (CESCO) was the United Kingdom-based division of the United States-based Electric Storage Battery Company (ESBC), a predecessor to today's Exide Technologies. In 1947, ESBC was forced to sell off CESCO following the decisions of a United States district court, and CESCO held the "Exide" trademark in the UK, and later sold batteries under the Exide name in India. In 1991, CESCO's successor, Chloride Group plc, fully divested its trademark in India and battery manufacturing operations to its current management.  In 1997, Exide Industries filed a lawsuit against Exide Technologies of the United States when the latter tried entering the Indian market, and both companies entered a prolonged legal battle that was heard by the Delhi High Court, which led to a 2012 verdict that Exide Industries was the legal owner of the Exide trademark in India.

An appeal was filed and in 2017, it was ruled that while Exide Industries was the trademark owner in India, Exide Technologies held the goodwill of the "Exide" name and both companies had a legitimate claim to use of the name in the Indian market. A further appeal from the Indian company that went to the Supreme Court of India led to a stay of the verdict, however, there was a restraining order on the use of the "Exide" name from the American company until the final verdict. Both parties settled in 2017, with an out of court settlement from Exide Industries to Exide Technologies, terms being that Exide Technologies waives any rights to the "Exide" trademark in India in perpetuity.

Research and development 
R&D work is carried out on various facets of lead-acid battery technology, which include development of new products for applications such as Automotive, Motorbike, VRLA, Telecom, UPS, Railways, Defence, etc. primarily to make the product range internationally competitive. In addition, the R&D is engaged in projects embracing process technology aimed at - improving the product quality & consistency, production efficiency and material utilization. Furthermore, R&D programme includes improvement and indigenisation of materials such as metals, alloys, plastics, etc. R&D emphasis is on studying and improving the environmental aspects associate with the manufacturing process.

Milestones 

1916- Chloride Electric Storage Co. (CESCO) UK sets up trading operations in India as an import house. 
1946- First factory set up in Shamnagar, West Bengal. 
1947- Incorporated as Associated Battery Makers (Eastern) Limited on 31 January 1947 under the Companies Act. 
1947- Incorporated Chloride International Limited (previously Exide Products Limited) 
1969- Second factory at Chinchwad, Pune 
1972- The name of the Company was changed to Chloride India Limited 
1976- R&D Centre established at Calcutta 
1981- Third factory at Haldia, West Bengal 
1988- The name of the Company was changed to Chloride Industries Limited 
1994- Technical collaboration with Shin Kobe Electric Machinery Co. Ltd. of Japan, a subsidiary of the Hitachi Group. 
1995- Chloride Industries Limited renamed Exide Industries Limited
1997- Fourth factory at Hosur, Tamil Nadu 
1998- Acquisition of industrial/ manufacturing units of Standard Batteries Ltd located at Taloja & Kanjurmarg (Maharashtra), Guindy (Tamil Nadu) and plant at Ahmednagar (Maharashtra) from Cosepa Fiscal Industries Limited as a going concern. 
1999- Acquired 51% Shareholding in Caldyne Automatics Ltd 
2000- Acquisition of 100% stake in Chloride Batteries S E Asia Pte Ltd., Singapore and 49% stake in Associated Battery Manufacturers (Ceylon) Limited, Sri Lanka. 
2003- Commissioned plant at Bawal, Haryana 
2003- New joint venture in UK, ESPEX, with 51% holding. 
2004- Associated Battery Manufacturers (Ceylon) Limited, Sri Lanka became a subsidiary consequent to acquiring further 12.50% Equity holding. 
2005- Investment in 50% shareholding of ING Vysya Life Insurance Company Limited 
2007- Caldyne Automatics Ltd becomes 100% subsidiary consequent to acquiring the balance 49% shareholding. 
2007- Investment with 26% shareholding.in CEIL Motive Power Pty Ltd. A Joint Venture in Australia. 
2007- Acquired 100% stake in Tandon Metals Ltd. 
2008- Acquired 51% stake in Lead Age Alloys India Ltd. 
2009- Divestment of shareholding in CEIL Motive Power Pty Ltd. 
2012- Acquisition of Inverter manufacturing facility at Roorkee, Uttarakhand 
2012- Technical Collaboration with East Penn Manufacturing Co., USA 
2012- Acquisition of second Inverter manufacturing facility at Haridwar, Uttarakhand. 
2012- Acquisition of balance 49% shares in ESPEX Batteries Limited, UK. 
2013- Acquisition of 26% shares of ING Vysya Life Insurance Company adding a total of 100% stake leading to "Exide Life Insurance Company".

Brands of Exide
EXIDE SF BATTERIES/SF SONIC
CHLORIDE SAFEPOWER
EXIDE XPLORE
EXIDE MILEAGE
EXIDE DYNEX
EXIDE EKO
EXIDE CHAMPION
EXIDE LITTLE CHAMP
BOSS
Hart
₨IB BATTER
₨BOSS
₨MREAD
₨XP
₨T25

Subsidiaries 
Associated Battery Manufacturers (Ceylon) Limited ("ABML")
Espex Batteries Limited ("ESP180EX")
Chloride Batteries S E Asia Pte Limited ("CBSEA")
Chloride Alloys India Limited (Leadage)
Chloride Metals Limited ("CML")
Chloride Power Systems & Solutions Ltd.("Formally known as Caldyne Automatics Ltd")
Chloride International Limited ("CIL") hart
Dynex
EXIDE ENERGY SOLUTIONS LIMITED ("EESL")

References

External links

Motor vehicle battery manufacturers
Consumer battery manufacturers
Manufacturing companies based in Kolkata
Indian brands
Indian companies established in 1947
1947 establishments in West Bengal
Manufacturing companies established in 1947
Companies listed on the National Stock Exchange of India
Companies listed on the Bombay Stock Exchange